In a theatre, a box, loge, or opera box is a small, separated seating area in the auditorium or audience for a limited number of people for private viewing of a performance or event.

Boxes are typically placed immediately to the front, side and above the level of the stage. They are separate rooms with an open viewing area which typically seat five people or fewer. Usually all the seats in a box are taken by members of a single group of people. A state box or royal box is sometimes provided for dignitaries.

In theatres without box seating the loge can refer to a separate section at the front of the balcony.

Sports venues such as stadiums and racetracks also have royal boxes or enclosures, for example at the All England Club and Ascot Racecourse, where access is limited to royal families or other distinguished personalities. In other countries, sports venues have luxury boxes aka skyboxes, where access is open to anyone who can afford tickets, sometimes bought by companies.

See also
 Balcony
 The gods (theatrical)
 Loggia

References

Parts of a theatre